Great Hill is a mountain in Barnstable County, Massachusetts. Cannon Hill is located northeast of Great Hill.

References

Mountains of Massachusetts
Mountains of Barnstable County, Massachusetts